Trilleen Pomare (born 5 April 1993) is an Australian rugby union player. She made her international debut for Australia at the 2017 Women's Rugby World Cup against Ireland. She plays at Fly-half for the Wallaroos and the Western Force in Super W.

In 2019 she was selected in the Australian squad that faced Japan in a two test series. She was later named in the squad again for a two-test series against New Zealand.

In 2022, Pomare featured for the Wallaroos in test matches against Fiji and Japan. She was named in Australia's squad for the 2022 Pacific Four Series in New Zealand. She made the Wallaroos squad for a two-test series against the Black Ferns at the Laurie O'Reilly Cup. She was selected in the team again for the delayed 2022 Rugby World Cup in New Zealand.

References

External links
Wallaroos Profile

1993 births
Living people
Australia women's international rugby union players
Australian female rugby union players